A flat cap is a rounded cap with a small stiff brim in front, originating in Britain and Ireland. The hat is known in Ireland as a paddy cap; in Scotland as a bunnet; in Wales as a Dai cap; and in the United States as an English cap, Irish cap, or flat cap.  Various other terms exist (cabbie cap, driver cap, longshoreman cap, ivy cap, train engineer cap, etc.). Cloths used to make the cap include wool, tweed (most common), and cotton. Less common materials may include leather, linen, or corduroy. The inside of the cap is commonly lined for comfort and warmth.

History

The style can be traced back to the 14th century in Northern England, when it was more likely to be called a "bonnet". This term was replaced by "cap" before about 1700, except in Scotland, where it continues to be referred to as a bunnet in Scots.

A 1571 Act of the English Parliament was enacted to stimulate domestic wool consumption and general trade. It decreed that on Sundays and holidays, all males over 6 years of age, except for the nobility and "persons of degree", were to wear woolen caps or pay a fine of three farthings per day. The Act was not repealed until 1597, though by then the flat cap had become firmly entrenched as a recognised mark of a non-noble person, such as a burgher, a tradesman, or an apprentice. The style may have been the same as the Tudor bonnet still used in some styles of academic dress.

In the 19th and early 20th centuries, when men predominantly wore some form of headgear, flat caps were commonly worn throughout Great Britain and Ireland. Versions in finer cloth were also considered to be suitable casual countryside wear for upper-class Englishmen. Flat caps were worn by fashionable young men in the 1920s. Boys of all classes in the United Kingdom wore caps during this period; a  peaked school cap of prescribed colour and design, of more rounded shape than men's flat caps, was part of the normal school uniform.

The flat cap made its way to southern Italy in the late 1800s, likely brought by British servicemen. In Turkey, the flat cap became the main headgear for men after it became a replacement for the fez, which was banned by Mustafa Kemal Atatürk in 1925.

British popular culture
In British popular culture, the flat cap (or "flat hat") is typically associated with older working-class men. The flat cap can also be taken to denote the upper class when affecting casualness. "A toff can be a bit of a chap as well without, as it were, losing face." In the late 20th and early 21st centuries, British public figures including David Beckham, Nigel Mansell, Guy Ritchie, Richard Blackwood, and Charles III wore the flat cap.

In Northern England, notable wearers include: Fred Dibnah, from Bolton; comic strip anti-hero Andy Capp, from Hartlepool, and AC/DC vocalist Brian Johnson, of Newcastle, customarily wears a flat cap frequently on and off stage.

In Peaky Blinders, a BBC television show about a former Birmingham-based gang, characters are seen wearing Baker Boy Caps, a similar style often confused for flat caps. It was thought, and adapted, that the gang had sewed-in razor blades on the peak of their flat caps for use as a weapon to blind their enemies.

Usage in the East End of London is illustrated by Jim Branning of the television soap opera EastEnders and Del Boy Trotter of Only Fools and Horses. Taxicab and bus drivers are often depicted wearing a flat cap, as comedically portrayed by Gareth Hale and Norman Pace's (Hale and Pace) "London cabbies" television sketches.

Current popularity

The style has remained popular among groups of people in the United Kingdom, Ireland, and North America. The cap is sometimes associated with older men, significantly in South Korea, but has been popular (along with the newsboy cap) among some segments of younger people, for example, in cities such as Chicago, Boston and New York with large Irish-American populations. It has appeared in the hip hop subculture, sometimes worn back-to-front or cocked to the side. It is also very common among men and women in San Francisco, California. In Turkey, it is highly popular amongst men, mostly working-class.

The English rugby league team Featherstone Rovers supporters' nickname is "the Flat Cappers", because supporters in years gone by attended matches wearing them as did most other teams' supporters.

The black leather flat cap is often combined with a patched-up sport coat or leather jacket and dark clothes (sometimes combined with a bee-striped convict's shirt) in popular culture to depict a burglar, mugger, or robber, occasionally with a domino mask. The comic book character the Goon is based on this archetype of the flat-capped street tough from vintage cartoons and comics.

Popular US golfer Bryson DeChambeau wears a flat cap during his rounds on the PGA Tour in honor of the late Payne Stewart and Ben Hogan. The look has rejuvenated popularity with the style amongst younger golfers. 

The Canadian team in the 1998 Winter Olympics wore red flat caps designed by Roots in the opening ceremony parade of nations. In addition, the US team in the 2008 Summer Olympics also wore white flat caps designed by Polo Ralph Lauren during the parade of nations.

It is commonly worn within the gopnik subculture in Russia.

See also
 Ascot cap
 Baseball cap
 British country clothing
 Coppola (cap)
 Newsboy cap
 Skipper cap

References

External links

Cap fits for new generation". Express & Star, July 2007.
 American boys' flat caps Historical Boys Clothing
 Ivy vs. Newsboy Caps Flat Cap Information Resource

Caps
British clothing
Northern England